Colchicum kotschyi is a species of flowering plant in the Colchicaceae family. It is native to Iran, Iraq and Turkey. It blooms relatively early for an autumn flowering colchicum, as early as August.  The flowers open to a pink-purple colour, but white flowered specimens are common in the wild.  The plant reaches up to 2 m (6") tall and grows well in sunny, warm locations.

References

kotschyi
Flora of Iraq
Flora of Iran
Flora of Turkey
Garden plants
Plants described in 1854
Taxa named by Pierre Edmond Boissier